Nicholas "Nick" Angell (born October 31, 1979) is an American professional ice hockey player. He is currently playing for the VIK Västerås HK of the Swedish HockeyAllsvenskan.

Angell is a very offensive defenseman who likes to join the rush, acting as a fourth forward at times.  Angell is a strong skater and plays a physical game.  His slapshot is hard and accurate, making him a valuable player on the power play and a threat to goalies.

Early career
Angell began his ice hockey career playing in the Duluth youth leagues where he honed his skills before playing at Duluth East High School. During his senior year, Angell led the Duluth East Greyhounds in winning the 1998 Minnesota High School Boys Hockey tournament, and was nominated for the Mr. Hockey award, which is given to Minnesota's most valuable high school hockey player. He was then recruited to play for the University of Minnesota in the National Collegiate Athletic Association (NCAA) Division I, from 1998 to 2002, where he helped Minnesota win their fifth NCAA Men's Ice Hockey Championship in 2002.

Professional career
Angell began his professional career in 2002–03, playing several games with the Milwaukee Admirals, the Nashville Predators' minor league affiliate in the AHL. He then spent the rest of the season with the Rockford Icehogs in the IHL, totaling 16 points in 73 games.

The next season (2003–04), Angell was signed by IFK Arboga, in the Swedish tier two league. During the 2004-05 season, he played for the Frisk Tigers in the Norwegian Elite League, before returning to the Swedish tier two league with Bofors IK, for the 2005-06 season. In 2006, Angell signed with the Swedish Elite League team Brynäs IF where he played for two seasons.

In 2007, Angell was selected to play for Team USA in the Deutschland Cup, where the United States finished in 2nd place after losing to Switzerland 3-2, in an overtime shootout.  In 2008, he signed a one-year contract with the 2007–08 Swedish Elite League Champions HV71, after playing a few games for the Tampere Battle Axe, in Finland. Angell joined HV71 for the 2008–09 season, after briefly playing the beginning of the season with the Norwegian team Stavanger Oilers.  After playing five seasons in Sweden, Angell moved to Germany for the 2009-10 season after signing with the Frankfurt Lions in the Deutsche Eishockey Liga.

In 2010, Angell played in the Kontinental Hockey League, after signing with Metallurg Novokuznetsk.  With 18 points in 51 games, he ended up being the club's top-scoring defenseman, but as Metallurg lost all chances to make the playoffs, Nick was traded to Avangard Omsk just hours before the trade deadline on 31 January 2011. While playing for Metallurg in the KHL, Angell was the first American to be named captain of a Russian professional ice hockey team.  Angell returned to the Deutsche Eishockey Liga for the 2011-12 season after signing with Eisbären Berlin.

After retiring for one year, Nicholas returned to Sweden in the all-svenskan league for Karlskrona Hockey Klub. Currently, Angell is playing for Västerås IK in all-svenskan.

Awards
 Minnesota State High School Hockey Champion, in 1998.
 NCAA Men's Division I Ice Hockey Champion, in 2002.
 Most Points by Defenseman, Norwegian Elite League, 2004-2005.
 Most Points by Foreigner, Allsvenskan, 2005-2006

In 2008, Angell received 4% of the votes in an internet survey for the World's Sportsman of the Year. The survey was conducted by a Finnish newspaper, Ilta-Sanomat. Angell finished fourth together with Argentine footballer Lionel Messi and just ahead of Alexander Ovechkin, of the Washington Capitals.

Career statistics

References

External links
 

1979 births
American men's ice hockey defensemen
Ice hockey people from Duluth, Minnesota
Brynäs IF players
Eisbären Berlin players
Frisk Asker Ishockey players
HV71 players
Living people
Stavanger Oilers players
Tappara players
NCAA men's ice hockey national champions